Siarhei Valadzko (born 19 October 1992) is a Belarusian rower. He competed in the 2020 Summer Olympics.

References

1992 births
Living people
Sportspeople from Pinsk
Rowers at the 2020 Summer Olympics
Belarusian male rowers
Olympic rowers of Belarus
Rowers at the 2010 Summer Youth Olympics